is the first video game in the Ninja-kun series. It was released for arcades, on the Famicom, and MSX by Jaleco in 1984. The MSX version was the only version released outside of Japan, as it was released in Europe under the name "Ninja".

Gameplay
Ninja-kun's Demon Castle Adventure features three upward scrolling levels that repeat and become more difficult. The objective is to defeat the enemies on each screen and advance to the next screen. The player can attack with shurikens and jump on enemies' heads to stun them. Occasionally, an orb will appear and if the player collects three, a bonus level will be unlocked.

Reception 
In Japan, Game Machine listed Ninja-Kid on their November 15, 1984 issue as being the second most-successful table arcade unit of the month.

Legacy
After Jaleco had ported the game and its sequel to the Famicom and MSX in Japan, the company created Ninja-kun's younger brother, Ninja JaJaMaru-kun and created their own series titled Ninja JaJaMaru-kun. The Ninja JaJaMaru-kun series would feature several games released on various consoles and handhelds, many of the games are different genres like role-playing video game gameplay.

Ninja-Kid II

It is the direct sequel of Ninja-Kid. Game Machine listed Ninja-Kid II on their June 1, 1987 issue as being the tenth most-successful table arcade unit of the month.

References

External links

Ninja-Kid II at arcade-history
Rad Action at arcade-history
Ninja-Kid (VC) HAMSTER page
Ninja-Kid II (VC) HAMSTER page
Ninja-Kid (PS4) HAMSTER page
Ninja-Kid II (PS4) HAMSTER page

1984 video games
Arcade video games
MSX2 games
Nintendo Entertainment System games
Ninja Jajamaru
Platform games
UPL Co., Ltd games
Video games about ninja
Virtual Console games
Multiplayer and single-player video games
Nintendo Switch games
PlayStation 4 games
PlayStation Network games
Video games about children
Video games developed in Japan
Video games set in castles
Hamster Corporation franchises
Jaleco games
Hamster Corporation games